Leopoldshöhe is a municipality in the Lippe district of North Rhine-Westphalia, Germany, with ca. 16,000 inhabitants (2015).

Located in the rolling plains north of the Teutoburger Wald range, Leopoldshöhe consists of eight formerly independent municipalities: Asemissen, Bechterdissen and Greste to the south, Leopoldshöhe proper, Krentrup and Schuckenbaum at the center, and Nienhagen and Bexterhagen to the north. Both Asemissen and Leopoldshöhe proper have a pronounced infrastructure (supermarkets, gas stations, specialized shops, etc.).

Located only 10 km  from the city of Bielefeld, the southern and central parts of the municipality today have a mostly suburban feel to them, but also contain several industrial zones, whereas the north is still mainly rural.

Asemissen is only a few hundred meters away from the A2 autobahn motorway, and (with the Oerlinghausen railway station) is on the railway line from Bielefeld to Detmold and Lemgo.  A bus service connects almost all villages to the railway station.

History 
Local proper names still existing today - particularly of the village of Krentrup - indicate settlements in the area well before 800 AD. The estate of Niederbarkhausen, at the border between Asemissen and Oerlinghausen, is mentioned in the oldest surviving document about the area, which dates from 1036 AD. In 1616, a total of 55 farms and estates is counted in the area of today's municipality.

Since this large rural area was rather sparsely populated, there was no church and people had to walk to other communities to attend service, until, in 1850, a church was built exactly in the middle between the neighboring churches of Oerlinghausen and Schötmar. Leopold II, Prince of Lippe, attended the consecration and named the budding village around the church after himself. Today, Leopoldshöhe proper is the only one of the eight constituent villages to have a centralized structure with church, market square, etc.

References

External links
 
 Official website 

Towns in North Rhine-Westphalia
Lippe
Principality of Lippe